The canton of Villeneuve-d'Ascq is an administrative division of the Nord department, northern France. It was created at the French canton reorganisation which came into effect in March 2015. Its seat is in Villeneuve-d'Ascq.

It consists of the following communes:
Forest-sur-Marque
Sailly-lez-Lannoy
Toufflers
Villeneuve-d'Ascq
Willems

References

Cantons of Nord (French department)